"The Ones That Like Me" is a song recorded by American country music singer Brantley Gilbert, written by himself along with Bobby Pinson and Blake Chaffin. It is the second single from his fourth major-label album, The Devil Don't Sleep.

Content
Gilbert says that the song is "just, straight-ahead, me in a nutshell". The song features a "mellow vibe" in which Gilbert sings about confiding in those who know him. The song's eponymous tour, The Ones That Like Me Tour, began on February 1, 2018.

Music video
The music video features footage of Gilbert riding his motorcycle and having a get-together with his family. His wife, Amber, is also featured in the video.

Charts

Weekly charts

Year-end charts

References

2017 songs
Brantley Gilbert songs
Songs written by Brantley Gilbert
Songs written by Bobby Pinson
Song recordings produced by Dann Huff
Big Machine Records singles